A Lion Is in the Streets is a 1953 American drama film directed by Raoul Walsh and starring James Cagney as a southern politician loosely based on Huey Long. Cagney's brother William was the producer, while his younger sister Jeanne was a member of the cast. The screenplay was based on a 1945 book by Adria Locke Langley. The film has similarities to the 1949 film  All the King's Men.

Plot 
Charismatic roving peddler Hank Martin (James Cagney) falls in love at first sight with schoolteacher Verity Wade (Barbara Hale) and soon marries her. On their wedding day, he rents a ramshackle home from his upper class lawyer friend Jules Bolduc (Warner Anderson). Hank rounds up some of his many friends to fix up the place, but Verity begins to realize that he is not as nice as he appears to be; while they do the work, he sees nothing wrong in going inside to read a law book. He confides to her that it is all a matter of manipulating people the right way.

Jules invites the couple to dine with him that night, but Hank soon quarrels with another guest, Robert L. Castleberry IV (Larry Keating). He accuses Castleberry, the owner of a company that buys cotton, of shortchanging the poor farmers.

When Hank goes about his business, Verity accompanies him to the bayou. A young woman named Flamingo (Anne Francis) leaps into his arms, but when she learns that he is now married, she tries to arrange for an alligator to rid her of her rival. Verity is only injured.  However, Flamingo does not give up on the man she has loved since she was a teen. After Hank sends Verity home to recover, Flamingo tracks Hank down on the road. She overcomes his resistance, and they start an affair.

Hank sets out to prove that Castleberry is cheating. When Hank proves that the weights used are seriously inaccurate, one of Castleberry's men aims a rifle at one of Hank's followers, and is killed by farmer Jeb Brown (John McIntyre).

To avoid inflammatory publicity, Castleberry sees to it that Brown's murder trial is repeatedly postponed. Shadowy power broker Guy Polli (Onslow Stevens) offers to use his influence to get the case heard in return for Hank's "thanks". When Castleberry manager Samuel T. Beach (James Millican) shoots and mortally wounds the prisoner, Hank persuades the dying man to go to court anyway. Even though Brown expires, Hank has enough time to persuade the jury to declare him innocent posthumously before the judge can adjourn, and to tell the true story to the gathered press.

The resulting publicity forces Castleberry to sell his company to Polli (though it turns out that his managers were the ones behind the fraud), and enables Hank to run for governor. However, a major rainstorm the day before the election prevents many of Hank's rural supporters from voting. In desperation, he goes to see Polli. Polli offers the votes of certain city precincts he controls, but in return, he insists that Hank sign an affidavit stating that Beach was with him at the time Brown was shot; the company Polli has bought would be destroyed if Beach were convicted. Hank reluctantly agrees.

Each candidate wins the same number of counties, but the state assembly that will break the tie is controlled by the incumbent. Rather than try again in four years, Hank urges his supporters to march on the capital as an armed mob. Just as they are starting out, Jules shows up, stating he has proof that Beach is Brown's murderer, and that Hank knowingly signed the false affidavit to get Polli's support. When Verity confirms Hank was actually with her at the time of the killing, Brown's widow shoots Hank. As Hank is dying, he tells his wife that his supporters were smarter than he thought.

Cast

Radio adaptation 
A Lion Is in the Streets was presented on Grand Central Station March 16, 1946. Jeanne Cagney starred in the adaptation.

References

External links 
 
 
 
 

1953 films
1950s political drama films
American political drama films
1950s English-language films
Films based on American novels
Films directed by Raoul Walsh
Films scored by Franz Waxman
Films shot in Florida
Warner Bros. films
Huey Long
1950s American films